Sopas Do Espírito Santo is a dish of the Azores region of Portugal made especially for the Pentecost feast. The soup contains cabbage, sausage, bacon, beef, wine and spices.

References

Portuguese cuisine
Catholic cuisine
Portuguese soups
Sausage dishes
Bacon dishes
Cabbage soups
Beef dishes
Wine dishes